Prescott School District may refer to:

 Prescott School District (Arkansas), based in Prescott, Arkansas.
 Prescott Community School District, based in Prescott, Iowa.
 Prescott School District (Washington), based in Prescott, Washington.
 Prescott School District (Wisconsin), based in Prescott, Wisconsin.
 Prescott Unified School District, based in Prescott, Arizona.